Sebastian Freis (born 23 April 1985) is a German former professional footballer who played as striker.

Club career
Before joining Karlsruher SC in 1999, Freis played as a youth member for SC Wettersbach. His debut for Karlsruhe came on 15 October 2004, in a 2. Bundesliga match against Rot-Weiss Essen where Freis immediately scored a hat-trick. Altogether he made 78 appearances and 22 goals in the 2. Bundesliga and played an important role in the 2006–07 season, when Karlsruhe gained promotion to the Bundesliga. In July 2009, he moved to 1. FC Köln.

In January 2015, he moved to 2. Bundesliga club Greuther Fürth on a free transfer, signing a contract until 2017. At the end of the 2016–17 season, he was released.

In August 2017, Freis joined 2. Bundesliga side Jahn Regensburg as a free agent, agreeing to a two-year contract. In 2019, when his contract ran out, he decided end his career.

International career
On 10 October 2006, he made his Germany U21 national team debut when the team lost 2–0 against England.

Career statistics

References

External links
 
 

1985 births
Living people
Footballers from Karlsruhe
German footballers
Association football forwards
Germany under-21 international footballers
Germany youth international footballers
Bundesliga players
2. Bundesliga players
Karlsruher SC players
Karlsruher SC II players
1. FC Köln players
SC Freiburg players
SpVgg Greuther Fürth players
SSV Jahn Regensburg players
21st-century German people